Suurberg Pass, (English: sour Mountain), is situated in the Eastern Cape, province of South Africa, on the regional road R335, between Patterson, Eastern Cape and Stonefountain.

Mountain passes of the Eastern Cape